Robert Baden Radford (19 January 1900 – 1970) was an English footballer who played as a goalkeeper for Brereton Social and Port Vale in the 1920s.

Career
Baden played for Brereton Social, before joining Port Vale as an amateur in July 1923 and signing as a professional the next month. He made his first team debut in a Potteries derby match at The Old Recreation Ground on 13 October, which Vale lost 3–2. The following two Second Division games were both against Leeds United, which were lost 1–0 at home and 3–0 at Elland Road. Tommy Lonsdale returned between the sticks after this and Radford was released at the end of the season and returned to Brereton Social.

Career statistics
Source:

References

1900 births
1970 deaths
Sportspeople from Lichfield
English footballers
Association football goalkeepers
Brereton Social F.C. players
Port Vale F.C. players
English Football League players